Virginian Outcast is a 1924 American silent drama film directed by Robert J. Horner and starring Jack Perrin, Marjorie Daw and Otto Lederer.

Main cast
 Jack Perrin as The Stranger
 Marjorie Daw as Madonna Webster
 Otto Lederer as Colonel Webster

References

Bibliography
 Munden, Kenneth White. The American Film Institute Catalog of Motion Pictures Produced in the United States, Part 1. University of California Press, 1997.

External links
 

1924 films
1924 drama films
1920s English-language films
American silent feature films
Silent American drama films
American black-and-white films
Films directed by Robert J. Horner
1920s American films
English-language drama films